Forbesdale is a suburb of Johannesburg, South Africa. It is a tiny northern suburb tucked between Orchards, Maryvale and Cheltondale. It is located in Region E of the City of Johannesburg Metropolitan Municipality.

History
Prior to the discovery of gold on the Witwatersrand in 1886, the suburb lay on land on one of the original farms called Klipfontein. It became a suburb on 24 July 1963 and the suburb name originates from two developers, Forbes Properties and Robert Forbes & Sons.

References

Johannesburg Region E